Mikhail Konstantinovich Anikushin ((19 September 1917, Moscow – 18 May 1997, Saint Petersburg) was a famous Soviet and Russian sculptor. Among his most famous works are a monument to Alexander Pushkin at Pushkinskaya Station of the Saint Petersburg Metro (1954), a monument to Alexander Pushkin at Arts Square in Saint Petersburg (1957) and a monument to Vladimir Lenin at Moskovskaya Square in Saint Petersburg.

A minor planet 3358 Anikushin discovered by Soviet astronomer Nikolai Chernykh in 1978 is named after him.

References

See also
 List of Russian artists
 Saint Petersburg Union of Artists
 1957 in art

1917 births
1997 deaths
20th-century Russian sculptors
Full Members of the Russian Academy of Arts
Full Members of the USSR Academy of Arts
Leningrad Secondary Art School alumni
Repin Institute of Arts alumni
Heroes of Socialist Labour
People's Artists of the USSR (visual arts)
Lenin Prize winners
Recipients of the Order of Friendship of Peoples
Recipients of the Order of Lenin
Recipients of the Order of the Red Banner of Labour
Russian male sculptors
Soviet sculptors